Tripoli Creek is a creek in the Nelson River drainage basin in Kenora District in northwestern Ontario, Canada.

See also
List of rivers of Ontario

References

Rivers of Kenora District